Sultan Abdullah bin Omar Al-Quaiti was the founder of Qu'aiti Sultanate in Hadhramaut, Yemen.

References
The Hadrami Diaspora: Community-building on the Indian Ocean Rim. By Leif O. Manger
Western Arabia & The Red Sea. By Naval

Monarchs of Yemen
Hadhrami people
20th-century Yemeni people